Timaeus of Tauromenium (born 356 or 350 BC; died ) was an ancient Greek historian. He was widely regarded by ancient authors as the most influential historian between the time of Ephorus (4th century BC) and Polybius (2nd century BC). In the words of scholar Lionel I. C. Pearson, Timaeus "maintained his position as the standard authority on the history of the Greek West for nearly five centuries."

Biography
Timaeus was born 356 or 350 to a wealthy Greek family in Tauromenium (modern Taormina), in eastern Sicily. His father, Andromachus, was a dynast who had been ruling Tauromenium since 358 after he seized the city from Dionysius of Syracuse.

In 316 or 315 BC, Timaeus is said to have been driven out of Sicily by Agathocles, the tyrant of Syracuse, possibly because of his hostility towards him, although it is likely that he left his hometown considerably earlier. Timaeus stated that he spent at least 15 years in Athens, where he studied under Philiscus of Miletus, a pupil of Isocrates. He wrote at that time his major work on history.

He died shortly after 264 BC, allegedly at the age of 96.

Work
While in Athens, he completed his great historical work, the Histories, which comprised thirty-eight books. This work was divided into unequal sections containing the history of Greece from its earliest days until the first Punic war. The Histories treated the history of Italy and Sicily in early times, of Sicily alone, and of Sicily and Greece together. The last five books address the time of Agathocles in detail; the work most likely concluded before the Romans crossed over into Sicily in 264. Timaeus also wrote a monograph on the Greek king Pyrrhus, which almost certainly had the wars against Rome as its centrepiece.

Timaeus devoted much attention to chronology and introduced the system of reckoning by Olympiads. In order to plot chronologies, he employed the years of Archons of Athens, of Ephors of Sparta, and of priestesses of Argos. This system, although not adopted in everyday life, was widely used by the Greek historians afterwards.

Timaeus can claim to be the first to recognize in his work the rising power of the Roman Republic, although it is not clear whether he regarded Rome as a potential friend or foe, and how he understood its significance for the history of the Mediterranean world as a whole. According to scholar Craige B. Champion, "Timaeus may well have been the first writer to see clearly the importance to the western Greeks of the victor of the great Sicilian War, whether it be Rome or Carthage, which he could not have divined."

Very few parts of the elaborate work of this historian were preserved after Antiquity:
 Some fragments of the 38th book of the Histories (the life of Agathocles);
 A reworking of the last part of his Histories, On Pyrrhus, treating the life of this king of Epirus until 264 BC;
 History of the cities and kings of Syria (unless the text of the Suda is corrupt);
 The chronological sketch (The victors at Olympia) perhaps formed an appendix to the larger work.

Reception
Timaeus was highly criticized by other historians, especially by Polybius, and indeed his unfairness towards his predecessors, which gained him the nickname of Epitimaeus (Επιτίμαιος, "fault-finder"), laid him open to retaliation. While Polybius was well-versed in military matters and a statesman, Timaeus is depicted as a bookworm without military experience or personal knowledge of the places he described. The most serious charge against him was that he willfully distorted the truth when influenced by personal considerations: thus, he was less than fair to Dionysius I of Syracuse and Agathocles, while loud in praise of his favourite Timoleon.

On the other hand, as even Polybius admitted, Timaeus consulted all available authorities and records. His attitude towards the myths, which he claimed to have preserved in their simple form, can be contrasted to the rationalistic interpretation under which it had become the fashion to disguise them. This is probably the origin of his nickname graosyllektria (γραοσυλλεκτρία; "Old Ragwoman", or "collector of old wives' tales"), an allusion to his fondness for trivial details.

Both Dionysius of Halicarnassus and the Pseudo-Longinus characterized him as a model of "frigidity", although the latter admitted that he was nevertheless a competent writer. Cicero, who was a diligent reader of Timaeus, expressed a far more favourable opinion, especially commending his copiousness of matter and variety of expression. Timaeus was one of the chief authorities used by Gnaeus Pompeius Trogus, by Diodorus Siculus, and by Plutarch (in his life of Timoleon).

See also
Timaeus of Locri

Notes

Bibliography

Further reading

Momigliano, A. (1987) "Athens in the third century BC and the discovery of Rome in the Histories of Timaeus of Tauromenium." In Essays in ancient and modern historiography: 37–66.

Walbank, F. W. (2002) "Timaeus' views on the past." In Polybius, Rome and the Hellenistic world: essays and reflections: 165–77.

Hellenistic-era historians
3rd-century BC historians
Sicilian Greeks
Historians from Magna Graecia
Ancient Greek political refugees
Hellenistic Athens
Pyrrhus of Epirus
350s BC births
250s BC deaths

Year of birth uncertain
Year of death uncertain